The Francis Cowherd House, off U.S. Route 68 near Greensburg, Kentucky, was probably built in the 1830s.  It was listed on the National Register of Historic Places in 1985.

It is a house with "fine Federal interior woodwork.  It is a one-story, seven-bay brick house, with brick laid in Flemish bond.  It has end chimneys which are partially exterior.  A second story, probably having five bays, was destroyed by a tornado "recently" (as of 1984).

See also
Jonathan Cowherd Jr. House, also NRHP-listed in Kentucky

References

National Register of Historic Places in Green County, Kentucky
Federal architecture in Kentucky
Houses completed in 1835
1835 establishments in Kentucky
Houses on the National Register of Historic Places in Kentucky
Houses in Green County, Kentucky